Erkki Arto Juhani Koivisto (12 April 1930 – 6 March 2016) was a Finnish basketball player.

The  Koivisto played his SM-sarja career for Karhun Pojat and Työväen Maila-Pojat. He was the top scorer of the league in 1953 season. Koivisto also capped 21 times for Finland men's national team and represented his country at the EuroBasket tournaments in 1951 and 1957 where Finland placed ninth and 11th, respectively. After his career as a player Koivisto worked as a headmaster. Koivisto died on 6 March 2016 in Espoo at 85 years of age.

Sources

References

1930 births
2016 deaths
Finnish men's basketball players
Sportspeople from South Savo